Paraguay gained independence from Spain in 1811.

Pre-stamp era
Paraguay operated an internal postal service from 1769 to 1811. Mail travelled from Buenos Aires via Santa Fe and Corrientes to Candelaria and Asuncion.

First stamps

The republic of Paraguay issued its first stamps (1, 2, and 3 Reales) on 1 August 1870, featuring a standing lion raising a republican hat, lithographed by R. Lange (Buenos Aires).

References

Communications in Paraguay
Philately by country